Parinamika was a not for profit organisation based in Bangalore, India. Its primary focus was encouraging increased awareness of the right to information among Indian citizens. It worked with another non-profit organisation based in Kolkata, Infocracy India, on a petition campaign to introduce a chapter on the Right to Information Act, 2005, in the high school syllabus. It aimed to bring more young people into governance.

References

Right to Information in India
Non-profit organisations based in India
Organisations based in Bangalore
2011 establishments in Karnataka
Organizations established in 2011